La Reforma is a municipality in the San Marcos department of Guatemala. The population is mostly indigenous-Mam and they speak their own language and Spanish also. The Catholic Church and the local precolonial religious practices exist together. Coffee is the main source of income.

History

La Reforma, Caserío was a San Marcos Department settlement under San Cristóbal Cucho municipality jurisdiction.  The main landowner was Mariano Maldonado, who harvested coffee, sugar cane and had some cattle. Back then, there were only nineteen inhabitants. On 31 October 1880, a census made by the Guatemalan government does not show La Reforma; it only talks about San Cristóbal Cucho, which had a small city and thirteen rural settlements.

In 1893, La Reforma was still a village of San Cristóbal Cucho, and in the 1921 census is shown with 6.125 inhabitants, 3.144 male and 2.981 female.  The population realized that it was time to set their own municipality to address their basic need and finally were able to create in 1988.  The named it "La Reforma" after general Justo Rufino Barrios, the Reformer, who was born in San Marcos Department.

"La Inmaculada Concepción" parish

"La Inmaculada Concepción" (English:The Immaculate Conception") parish in La Reforma municipality was founded on 1 January 1956 and originally served both La Reforma and El Quetzal municipalities.  Its first priest was father Jaime López, a Franciscan, who led the parish until 5 March 1958.  His successor was father Juan Bartolomé Bueno, who was in charge until 31 July 1960, when father Pedro López Nadal, from Spain, took charge. On 23 April 1961, church construction was completed and it was opened and blessed by San Marcos dioceses Bishop, Celestino Fernández.  Father López Nadal led the parish until 25 January 1964, when father Juan Van Der Vaeren took his place.  In 1965, El Quetzal was elevated to parish and had its own priest, leaving La Reforma.  Between 1967 and 1968, fathers Jorge Helin, Domingo Ezcurra and Bishop Próspero Penados —San Marcos auxiliary Bishop and eventual Guatemala Archbishop—, took care of the parish; however, on 25 August 1968 father Francisco Herrero Sánchez was appointed and he was in charge of the parish for more than twenty years.

Brief historic description of La Reforma communities

Climate

La Reforma has tropical climate (Köppen: Am).

Geographic location

La Reforma is completely surrounded by San Marcos Department municipalities and has an area of 60 km2.

Distances to other settlements

See also

 La Aurora International Airport
 Tapachula International Airport

Notes and references

References

External links
Some information

Municipalities of the San Marcos Department